The Alexander Lake Shelter Cabin is a historic backcountry shelter in the Admiralty Island National Monument.  It is located at the eastern tip of Lake Alexander, on the Admiralty Island Canoe Route.  The cabin is a three-sided Adirondack log shelter made of peeled logs covered with wood shakes.  It was constructed by a Civilian Conservation Corps crew in 1935, and received maintenance from the United States Forest Service as recently as 1980.

The cabin was listed on the National Register of Historic Places in 1995.

See also
National Register of Historic Places listings in Hoonah–Angoon Census Area, Alaska

References

1935 establishments in Alaska
Park buildings and structures on the National Register of Historic Places in Alaska
Buildings and structures completed in 1935
Buildings and structures in Hoonah–Angoon Census Area, Alaska
Tongass National Forest
Civilian Conservation Corps in Alaska
Buildings and structures on the National Register of Historic Places in Hoonah–Angoon Census Area, Alaska